Rock 'n' Roll Gypsies is the second live album by the band Saxon, released in 1989 by Roadrunner Records. It was the first album produced by Biff Byford and the first work with the bass guitarist Nibbs Carter. In addition it was the drummer Nigel Glockler's return to the band. In 2001, it was re-released with a different cover and two additional tracks, and with production credited to the whole band and not just to Byford.

Track listing

"The Eagle Has Landed" and "Just Let Me Rock" are CD bonus tracks.

The Saxon Chronicles, 2015, re-release is a double-disc DVD which now also includes a bonus CD titled Rock’n’Roll Gypsies 1989 Live

Line up
Biff Byford – vocals
Graham Oliver – guitar
Paul Quinn – guitar
Timothy "Nibbs" Carter – bass guitar
Nigel Glockler – drums

References

Saxon (band) live albums
1989 live albums
Roadrunner Records live albums
Enigma Records live albums